Slovenian potica is a nut roll and a traditional festive pastry from Slovenia.

The name of potica is distinctly Slovenian and developed etymologically from earlier Slovenian forms such as povitica, povtica, potvitsa. This is also connected with the development of potica production methods from the Middle Ages (before the 15th century) to the beginning of the 20th century, when development stabilized and the unique naming of potica was established from the 18th century. The term Slovenian potica has been used since the second half of the 19th century.

Varieties
Slovenian potica consists of a rolled pastry made of leavened paper-thin dough filled with any of a great variety of fillings, but most often with walnut filling.

The most characteristic Slovenian poticas are made with ground walnut, tarragon, quark, hazelnut, pumpkin seed or poppy seed, salted ones even with cracklings or bacon, and other fillings. Slovenian potica is a festive pastry and could be baked in two ways: in the oven or directly on the hearth, but original Slovenska potica is a ring-shaped pastry, baked always in the special shaped potica baking mould (ceramic, glass or tin one), called potičnik, which has a conical protrusion in the middle. 

Potica is served also every Easter and Christmas in Slovenia and is still very popular even in some parts of the United States. For example, potica is a popular offering at many local bakeries in Hibbing, Minnesota based on recipes handed down for generations in the immigrant community.

Protection regime
Slovenska potica has been registered as a Traditional speciality guaranteed (TSG) in the European Union since April 2001.

See also

 Belokranjska povitica

References

Pastries with poppy seeds
Slovenian pastries
Traditional Speciality Guaranteed products from Slovenia